César Pablo Vaccia Izami (born 10 December 1952) is a Chilean football manager and former footballer.

Career
As a footballer, he played for San Antonio Unido and Audax Italiano.

He is well known in his country for reach two consecutive league titles and a cup title with Universidad de Chile between 1999 and 2001 as well as his spells as Chilean football team coach in its U-17, U-20 and U-23 categories.

Honours

Club

Manager
Universidad de Chile
 Primera División de Chile (2): 1999, 2000
 Copa Chile: 2000

References

1939 births
Living people
Chilean people of Italian descent
Chilean people of Croatian descent
People from San Antonio, Chile
Chilean footballers
San Antonio Unido footballers
Audax Italiano footballers
Primera B de Chile players
Chilean Primera División players
Chilean football managers
Primera B de Chile managers

Chilean Primera División managers
Universidad de Chile managers
Chile national football team managers
Chile national under-20 football team managers